Yuhuatai District is one of 11 districts of Nanjing, the capital of Jiangsu province, China.

Geography 
Yuhuatai District is located in the south of the main city of Nanjing, in the lower reaches of the Yangtze River, bordering Jiangning District in the east and south, facing Pukou District across the Yangtze River in the west, and bordering Qinhuai District and Jianye District in the north, covering an area of 132.39 square kilometers (excluding the river area).

Administrative divisions
In the present, Yuhuatai District has 7 subdistricts.
7 Subdistricts

Transportation
Nanjing South railway station

See also
 Yuhuatai Memorial Park of Revolutionary Martyrs

References

www.xzqh.org 

County-level divisions of Jiangsu
Districts of Nanjing